An antique is an old collectible item

Antique may also refer to:
 Antique (band), a Greek-Swede musical group
 Antique (EP), 2000 release by the duo
 Antique (film), a 2008 South Korean film
 The Antique (film), a 2014 film starring Olu Jacobs and Bimbo Akintola
 Antiques (magazine), a monthly arts publication
 Antique (province), a province of the Philippines in the Western Visayas region

See also 
 Antiquity (disambiguation)
 Antiqua (disambiguation)